Calum MacKay (born 1 January 2004) is a Scottish footballer who plays as a midfielder for Inverness Caledonian Thistle.

He is the younger brother of Hibernian midfielder, Daniel MacKay who also plays for Inverness Caledonian Thistle.

Career 
In July 2022, MacKay was called up to the senior team alongside fellow academy graduates Keith Bray and Matthew Strachan.

On 27 August 2022, MacKay was named as an unused substitute in a 1–0 home loss to Greenock Morton, but the following Wednesday, MacKay made his senior debut, coming on to replace his older brother, Daniel, in the 87th minute during a 4–0 loss away to Motherwell in the League Cup.

References

2004 births
Living people
Inverness Caledonian Thistle F.C. players
Association football midfielders
Footballers from Inverness
Scottish footballers
Scottish Professional Football League players